Ikhtiyor Karimovich Navruzov (born 5 July 1989 in Bukhara) is an Uzbek freestyle wrestler. He competed in the 66 kg event at the 2012 Summer Olympics and lost quarter finals match against India's Sushil Kumar. He is a silver 2015 World Wrestling Championships medalist in the 65 kg.

Navruzov won a bronze medal at the 2016 Summer Olympics in the 65 kg freestyle wrestling event against Mongolia's Ganzorigiin Mandakhnaran. The Mongolian coaches protested the loss, as Navruzov won a penalty point on a technicality in the final seconds of the match. Upon realizing he had won bronze, Navruzov twice screamed "Allahu Akbar," the Islamic Takbir. Before the bout against Ganzorigiin Mandakhnaran, Navruzov was also part of another controversy where he defeated Puerto Rico's Franklin Gómez, which would result of an investigation made by the United World Wrestling that would suspend four judges from Georgia, South Korea, Germany and Russia.

Rio 2016

Match against Franklin Gómez
At the 2016 Olympics in Rio de Janeiro, Brazil, Navruzov faced Franklin Gómez of Puerto Rico. Gómez and Navruzov were tied 5–5 in the second round. As the fight was about to end, Gómez made a move that took Navruzov outside of the ring, initially warranting two points for Gómez. However, one of the officers argued that the move favored Navruzov, forcing Gómez' corner to challenge the call. When the officers decided against him, the bout ended 8–5 for Navruzov.

Shortly after the fight, at least three officers in charge of the match were suspended by United World Wrestling because of "suspicious officiating". They also claimed that an investigation would be done, but their decision couldn't be overturned. In 3 September 2016, it was announced that at least three officers were officially expelled from the UWW, without offering the reasons for the expulsion.

Match against Ganzorigiin Mandakhnaran
During the second bronze medal match between Navruzov and Mongolia's Ganzorigiin Mandakhnaran in the 65 kg freestyle wrestling caused controversy over Navruzov being awarded two penalty points toward the end of the match.  During the final seconds, Mandakhnaran held a lead of 7–6 and began celebrating before the match had concluded.  In response, Navruzov was awarded a penalty point for Mandakhnaran "failing to engage" during the end of the match, which resulted in Navruzov winning the bronze due to scoring the last point.  The Mongolian coaches protested the point, which could not be challenged, by stripping in front of the judges on the mat, resulting in a shoe being sent into the judges' table.  Navruzov would be awarded a second penalty point as the coaches were escorted away from the mat, leading to the final score being 7–8.

References

External links 
 Ikhtiyor Navruzov Facebook
 Ikhtiyor Navruzov Instagram

1989 births
People from Bukhara
Uzbekistani male sport wrestlers
Olympic wrestlers of Uzbekistan
Wrestlers at the 2012 Summer Olympics
Living people
Asian Games medalists in wrestling
Wrestlers at the 2010 Asian Games
Wrestlers at the 2014 Asian Games
World Wrestling Championships medalists
Asian Games bronze medalists for Uzbekistan
Wrestlers at the 2016 Summer Olympics
Medalists at the 2016 Summer Olympics
Medalists at the 2014 Asian Games
Olympic bronze medalists for Uzbekistan
Asian Wrestling Championships medalists
Islamic Solidarity Games competitors for Uzbekistan
20th-century Uzbekistani people
21st-century Uzbekistani people